P.U.N.K. Girl, also known as Atta Girl in the UK, is an EP by British twee pop band Heavenly, released by K Records on 11 July 1995. In 2005, Pitchfork Media's Nitsuh Abebe wrote that it was "so bouncy and full of hooks that it can take a while to notice it's kind of a concept record about date rape."

Track listing

Personnel 
Amelia Fletcher – Guitar, vocals
Mathew Fletcher – Drums
Peter Momtchiloff – Guitar
Rob Pursey – Bass
Cathy Rogers – Keyboards, vocals
Ian Shaw – Engineer

References 

Heavenly (British band) albums
K Records EPs
1995 EPs